Arcane Station (born 21 March 1981) is a Norwegian musician, producer and songwriter.

He released his debut single, Make Me a Bird, in January 2015. The song, featuring singer-songwriter Marianne Hekkilæ on lead vocals, was playlisted by a number of Norwegian radio stations, including NRK P3 and NRK P1. In autumn 2015 the song was officially released in Sweden and Poland.

Discography

Extended plays
 Doin' It My Own Way EP (2015)

Singles
 "Crossing Rivers (Away From You)" (2018)
 "Golden" (2017)
 "1minutecanbepowerful" (2017)
 "Make Me a Bird (Arcane Runway Edition)" (2017)
 "Let Them Fall" feat. Marianne Hekkilæ (2016)
 "Doin' It My Own Way" feat. Lydia Waits (2015)
 "Make Me a Bird" feat. Marianne Hekkilæ (2015)

Music videos
 "Let Them Fall" (2017), directed by Christopher Meyers, a director from USA.
 "Make Me a Bird" (2015), directed by Iwona Bielecka, a director from Warsaw, Poland.

References

External links
 Official homepage

1981 births
Living people
Musicians from Bodø
Norwegian pop musicians
Norwegian electronic musicians